Big Horn County School District may refer to the following school districts in Big Horn County, Wyoming (USA):

Big Horn County School District #1
Big Horn County School District #2
Big Horn County School District #3
Big Horn County School District #4